Lekh Nath Dahal is a Nepalese politician, belonging to the Communist Party of Nepal (Maoist Centre) currently serving as the member of the 2nd Federal Parliament of Nepal. In the 2022 Nepalese general election, he won the election from Sindhuli 2 (constituency).

References

Living people
Nepal MPs 2022–present
1976 births